Pakosław of Sandomierz (Polish: Pakosław z Sandomierza, Pakosław Sandomierski) was a Polish noble who was the Voivode of Sandomierz until his death at the Battle of Chmielnik in March 1241. During his tenure the First Mongol invasion of Poland began in 1240 and Sandomierz was sacked in February 1241, Pakosław fled to Kraków. He and his fellow Lesser Poland Voivode Włodzimierz assembled an army and met the Mongol invasion forces on open battle in the Battle of Chmielnik; both were slain, as was the Sandomierz Castellan Jakub Raciborowicz.

References

Polish nobility